Anthony Stevenson (born 24 July 1988) is a Scottish footballer who plays as a right back and midfielder for Petershill in the Scottish Junior Football Association, West Region. He has previously played in the Scottish Premier League for Hamilton Academical.

Career
Born in Glasgow, Stevenson began his career with Hamilton Academical. He made his senior debut for the Accies in August 2005, in a Scottish League Cup tie against Dumbarton. He spent the rest of the season on loan at Alloa Athletic, where he made 16 appearances, scoring 1 goal. He scored a penalty in a 2–0 victory over Clyde in April 2008, on the day Hamilton won promotion to the Scottish Premier League. On 17 May 2008, Stevenson signed an extension to his contract that will keep him with Hamilton until 2010. Stevenson was the first Hamilton player to score a goal in the SPL, scoring a free-kick in Accies' 3–1 victory over Dundee United in their first ever SPL game.

He joined Clyde in January 2009, on a loan deal until the end of the season. He made his debut in a 4–2 defeat against Partick Thistle on 3 January. He made 9 appearances in total for Clyde. After returning to Hamilton, Stevenson was again loaned to Alloa in March 2010, where he made six SFL appearances for them.

Stevenson was released from his contract with Hamilton at the end of the 2009–10 season. He subsequently joined Albion Rovers on an initial one-month deal. In May 2011, Stevenson played in two play-off games for Albion, which secured promotion to the Second Division.

Stevenson was released by Albion at the end of the 2012–13 season, and he subsequently had an unsuccessful trial with Northern Irish team Portadown.

On 24 September 2013, Stevenson joined Sauchie Juniors before moving to fellow Junior side Petershill in July 2014.

Career statistics

Honours
Hamilton Academical
Scottish Football League First Division: 2007–08

References

1988 births
Living people
Footballers from Glasgow
Association football fullbacks
Association football midfielders
Scottish footballers
Hamilton Academical F.C. players
Alloa Athletic F.C. players
Clyde F.C. players
Albion Rovers F.C. players
Sauchie F.C. players
Petershill F.C. players
Scottish Football League players
Scottish Premier League players
Scottish Junior Football Association players